Rebel Magazine is a bi-annual fashion and lifestyle magazine, focusing on creative industries including designers, art, film and music.

The magazine is published by University of Northampton graduate Namal Lanka, who serves as the magazine's editor and creative director.

The magazine was founded in November 2009 and the first issue was published online on 31 March 2010. The magazine features up and coming brands, emerging fashion graduates, independent designers and unpublished writers. The online readership for the first issue of the magazine reached in excess of twenty-thousand, prompting the publishers to print a limited number of copies.

References

External links 
 Rebel Magazine official website

Fashion magazines published in the United Kingdom
Lifestyle magazines published in the United Kingdom
Independent magazines
Magazines established in 2009
Biannual magazines published in the United Kingdom
Online magazines published in the United Kingdom